French submarine Agosta may refer to more than one submarine of the French Navy:

 , a  submarine commissioned in 1937 and scuttled in 1940
 , an  submarine in commission from 1977 to 1997

See also
 Agosta-class submarine

French Navy ship names